Governor Márquez may refer to:

Francisco Menéndez Márquez (died 1649), Governor of Spanish Florida from 1646 to 1648
Juan Menéndez Márquez (died 1627), Interim Governor of Spanish Florida from 1595 to 1597, and Governor of Popayán Province from 1620 to 1627
Pedro Menéndez Márquez (died 1600), 3rd Governor of Spanish Florida from 1577 to 1594

See also
Silvino Silvério Marques (1918–2013), Portuguese Colonial Governor of Cape Verde from 1958 to 1962 and Governor of Angola from 1962 to 1966 and in 1974